Brian Plummer (1936–2003) was a Welsh writer and dog breeder. 

Brian Plummer may also refer to:

Brian Plummer (musician) (died 2008), Canadian musician
Brian Plummer (American football), college athlete